St. Peter's Higher Secondary School was established in 1999 at B.C. Road, Jammu. It was founded by Bishop Rt. Rev. Peter Celestine OFM. Cap. The school was shifted to a new location, Karan Bagh, in July 2000. The school runs under administration of the Diocese of Jammu-Srinagar Education Society. Carmelite Nuns were added into the school to help the quality of education.

See also 
 List of Christian schools in India

References

Educational institutions established in 1999
Schools in Jammu (city)
Private schools in Jammu and Kashmir
Christian schools in Jammu and Kashmir
Catholic schools in India